The 2006 AMA National Speedway Championship Series was staged over three rounds, which were held at Costa Mesa (August 5), Auburn (September 1) and Auburn (October 7). Greg Hancock won the title to equal Mike Bast's all-time record. It was also Hancock's fourth successive AMA title.

Event format 
Over the course of 20 heats, each rider raced against every other rider once. The field was then split into sections of four riders, with the top four entering the 'A' Final. Points were then awarded depending on where a rider finished in each final. The points in the 'A' Final were awarded thus, 20, 18, 16 and 14. Bonus points for were also awarded.

Classification 

 Mike Faria won a run-off against Charlie Venegas to take third place in the Championship.

References 

AMA
United States
Speed
Speed